Rift Valley Province of Kenya, bordering Uganda, was one of Kenya's eight provinces, before the Kenyan general election, 2013.
Rift Valley Province was the largest and one of the most economically important provinces in Kenya. It was dominated by the Kenya Rift Valley which passes through it and gives the province its name. The bulk of the provincial population inhabited a strip between former Nairobi and Nyanza Province. The capital was the town of Nakuru.

Counties 
As of March 2013 after the Kenyan general election, 2013, the Province was partitioned into counties and Rift Valley Province was dissolved.

Geography 

The Great Rift Valley runs south through Kenya from Lake Turkana in the north and has several unique geographical features, including the Elgeyo escarpment which is a popular tourist attraction.

Apart from the Rift Valley itself, the area has other important geographic features such as: the extinct volcanoes Mount Longonot and Mount Suswa and Lake Baringo, Lake Bogoria, Lake Magadi, Lake Nakuru, Lake Naivasha, the  Suguta Valley, and Lake Turkana.

Geology 
A large part of Kenya is underlain by Precambrian basement, while the Kenya rift basin (a typical extensional basin) hosts Tertiary volcanics that cover Mesozoic sediments (Recently these sediments have been considered for oil exploration). The sedimentary basins evolved along the Anza trough during the Late Paleozoic to Early Tertiary times through extension tectonics during the major Gondwanaland breakup. In the Miocene Period the region underwent intermittent uplift and subsidence along major boundary faults accompanied by the large outpouring of lava flows. The Anza trough intersects the modern rift valley in the area of Lake Turkana. Rifting still continues today; primarily in the north, where active volcanoes are more plentiful.

Economy 
The highlands provide adequate rainfall for farming and agriculture which is the economic base of the residents of the Rift Valley.  Tea from the highlands in the Kericho district enjoy a worldwide reputation, but horticulture is an important part of the district's economy and cattle raising is also practised to a large extent.

The full economic potential of the Rift Valley region is, however, far from fully exploited, though the current growth in population and improved education may change this in a near future.  People in the province are still mostly rural, but urbanisation is gradually increasing; new cities and towns contain the rural-urban migration and, provided the right policies are instituted, the Rift Valley province will be able to emerge as a national economic and cultural hub.

Ethnicity 
The Rift Valley is home to various communities. The people of the Rift Valley are a mesh work of different ethnic identities, and the Kalenjin and the Maasai are two of the best known ethnic groups.  Most of Kenya's top runners come from the Kalenjin community.  The Maasai people have the most recognizable cultural identity, both nationally and internationally, and serve as Kenya's international cultural symbol.

Villages and settlements

See also
 Kerio River

References

External links
 

 
Provinces of Kenya
Great Rift Valley
Former provinces
2013 disestablishments in Kenya